The Prince Hall Masonic Temple in Harlem, Manhattan in New York City, is a meeting place for Prince Hall freemasons.

Originally built in 1925 it first served as the Masonic Temple for the William McKinley Lodge.

It was used as a building for the Savage School for Physical Education, but after that went back into masonic use, being used by the overwhelmingly African American Prince Hall branch of Freemasonry.

It is located on 155th Street between Amsterdam and St. Nicholas Avenues.

References

Clubhouses in Manhattan
1925 establishments in New York City
Buildings and structures completed in 1925